This article contains a list of the flags and/or modifications made to the flags of current U.S. states and territories, through the present day.

U.S. states

Territories

See also
Timeline of national flags

References

History of flags